DKB may stand for:

 Dai-Ichi Kangyo Bank, Japan
 Deutscher Kanarien- und Vogelzüchterbund, a German Bird Association
 Deutsche Kreditbank, a German bank
 Ostseestadion (previously DKB-Arena), a German football stadium
 Deutscher Künstlerbund (Association of German Artists) 
 Danish Royal Library (Det Kongelige Bibliotek)
 DKB (band), South Korea